Stanislav Angelovič (born 26 March 1982) is a retired Slovak footballer who is mostly known for playing at MŠK Žilina, playing for Žilina during the club's golden period winning the Corgoň Liga twice, the Slovak Cup once and qualifying for the club's first and only appearance at the group stage of the UEFA Champions League. After his time with Žilina, Angelovič moved to play for and manage Svätý Jur.

Angelovič appears in RTVS, Slovak public broadcaster, during televised national team or club international fixtures as well as major tournaments, like UEFA Euro 2020, as an expert analyst and panel member.

Club career statistics
(correct as of 30 December 2012)

Honours

As Player
ŠK Slovan
Corgoň Liga:
Winner (1): 2008–09,
MŠK Žilina
Corgoň Liga:
Winner (2): 2009–10, 2011–12
Slovak Super Cup:
Winner (1): 2010
Slovak Cup:
Winner (1): 2011–12
Runner-up (2): 2010–11, 2012–13

As Coach
ŠK Svätý Jur
'3. Liga: Winners (1): 2015–16 (Promoted)

References

External links
 

1982 births
Living people
Slovak footballers
Slovakia youth international footballers
FC Senec players
Maccabi Netanya F.C. players
ŠK Slovan Bratislava players
MŠK Žilina players
Slovak Super Liga players
Expatriate footballers in Israel
Slovak expatriate footballers
Association football fullbacks
Footballers from Bratislava
Slovak television people